Études transcendantales is a song cycle in 9 movements for mezzo-soprano and chamber ensemble composed by Brian Ferneyhough between 1982 and 1985.

Background 
The creative basis for the Études transcendantales is Ferneyhough's mild mid-life crisis. He thought about death and what makes music more than just music of the moment, and thus the songs deal with such themes. As part of this, he wanted the ensemble to sound rather harsh. Starting from the standard modernist Pierrot ensemble, he replaced the clarinet exchanged for an oboe, the piano for a harpsichord, and removed the violin altogether. Including the voice, now all the parts are very different from each other and have strongly contrasting timbres, e.g., the pointillistic harpsichord with the smoother mezzo-soprano.

Originally, Ferneyhough intended all the songs to be set to poems by the German poet Ernst Meister. However, he could not find enough suitable poems on death and permanence, and instead commissioned a poet friend, Alrun Moll, to write texts for the remaining songs.

Music 
Like many other works by Ferneyhough and other New Complexity composers, Études transcendantales is infamously difficult to perform and is extremely complicated. Pitch-wise, the notes are freely sampled from all 12 tones and the quarter tones in between. Rhythmically, Ferneyhough is known for his nested irregular tuplets, and there is no exception here. Almost each individual note also has its own unique dynamics and articulation, including extended techniques such as multiphonics on the oboe, glottal stops for the voice, and key-clicking for the flute.

Throughout the nine songs, the process of composition transitions from a serialist-type systematic approach in the first song to an intuitive and free approach by the last song.  While Ferneyhough thought this system is important, the practical effects are not discernible to the listener, as his intuitive composition produces music like that produced by his automation methods

For example, for the oboe part in the first song, the rhythm is almost totally determined by a strict system, with five stages of complexity, each determined by another cycle of numbers:
 dividing each measure into a number of notes
 subdividing chunks of those notes into another layer
 adding dots so that 4 notes fit where 3 did previously
 tie some notes with each other and replace others with rests
 replace two consecutive notes with a triplet in which one beat is a rest
Each subsequent song has its own unique system (or intuitive development) for the creation of all aspects of the composition.

Alternatively, if only to prove that the score is self-consistent, the rhythm can be deconstructed. The very first measure can be broken down in increasing complexity (note that the actual meter is in 2/10, but is really equivalent to a 2/8 measure at 5/4 the speed):

References 
 Toop, Richard (1991). "Brian Ferneyhough's Études transcendantales: A Composer's Diary (Part 1)". Eonta 1 (1), 55–89.

Further reading 
 Chapman, Jane (2001). "An Interview with Brian Ferneyhough: Thoughts on the Harpsichord in Études transcendentales". Contemporary Music Review 20 (1), 101–106.

Compositions by Brian Ferneyhough
1985 compositions
Chamber music compositions
Classical song cycles